Mars Theatre is a historic theatre building at Lafayette, Tippecanoe County, Indiana.  It was built in 1921, and is a four-story, rectangular, Georgian Revival style brick building, with limestone ornamentation and terra cotta panels. It measures 69 feet, 4 inches, wide and 141 feet, 4 inches deep.  It was originally built as a vaudeville theater and sat 1,205 patrons. The building houses the Denis H. Long Center for the Performing Arts.

It was listed on the National Register of Historic Places in 1981.

References

External links
Cinema Treasures: Long Center for the Performing Arts

Theatres on the National Register of Historic Places in Indiana
Colonial Revival architecture in Indiana
Georgian Revival architecture in Indiana
Theatres completed in 1921
Buildings and structures in Lafayette, Indiana
National Register of Historic Places in Tippecanoe County, Indiana